Jacquette-Marie-Joséphine Gounon de Loubens, called Jonquiérette, later Vignes de Cayras (1771-1803) was a French painter.

Born in Toulouse, Gounon de Loubens was the sister of painter Jean-Mathieu Gounon de Loubens. She studied art with Sabère and exhibited her work in her native city from 1787 until 1791; several portraits in pastel are known to have been shown at the Toulouse Salon during this time. In 1791 she married Raymond Vignes de Cayras. Their son Stéphani Vignes was studying with Pierre-Narcisse Guérin in Rome in 1824.

References

1771 births
1803 deaths
French women painters
18th-century French painters
18th-century French women artists
Pastel artists
Artists from Toulouse